The 2013 Africa Cup of Nations was an international football tournament held in South Africa from 19 January until 10 February 2013.

The Confederation of African Football confirmed 9 January as the deadline for final squad submissions ahead of the tournament.  The African confederation wanted all 23-man squad lists sent to its Cairo headquarters by midnight GMT on 9 January. Failing to do so would result in a fine and infringing countries will only be allowed to take a 22-man squad to the finals.

Along with their 23-man squads, countries were allowed to bring a delegation of 17 officials.

Group A

South Africa
Coach: Gordon Igesund

Cape Verde 
Coach: Lúcio Antunes

Angola 
Coach:  Gustavo Ferrín

Morocco 
Coach: Rachid Taoussi

Group B

Ghana 
Coach: James Kwesi Appiah

Mali 
Coach:  Patrice Carteron

Niger 
Coach:  Gernot Rohr

DR Congo 

Coach:  Claude Le Roy

Group C

Zambia 
Coach:  Hervé Renard

Nigeria 
Coach: Stephen Keshi

|}

Burkina Faso 
Coach:  Paul Put

Ethiopia 
Coach: Sewnet Bishaw

Group D

Ivory Coast 
Coach:  Sabri Lamouchi

Tunisia 
Coach: Sami Trabelsi

Algeria 
Coach:  Vahid Halilhodžić

A 40-man provisional squad was announced on 10 December 2012. A 24-man list was announced on 18 December 2012, with Ishak Belfodil, Mokhtar Benmoussa, Antar Boucherit, Madjid Bougherra, Hamza Boulemdaïs, Ismaël Bouzid, Farouk Chafaï, Abdelmoumene Djabou, Moustapha Djallit, Rafik Djebbour, Ahmed Gasmi, Abderahmane Hachoud, Féthi Harek, Hamza Koudri and Mohamed Zemmamouche being left out of the team. On 22 December 2012, Djamel Abdoun dropped out of the squad after an injury, thus leaving the team with a final 23-man squad.

Togo 
Coach:  Didier Six

Player representation

By club
Clubs with 3 or more players represented are listed.

By club nationality

By club federation

By representatives of domestic league

References

Africa Cup of Nations squads
Squads